Liudmila Sultanovna Gatagova is a Russian historian, essayist, and the Research Fellow at the Institute of History of the Russian Academy of Sciences of Lezgin descent, specializing in international relations and history of the Russian Empire and the Caucasus until the Revolution of 1917, including the crystallization of the Russian national identity and the accompanied ethnic conflicts within the state.

Gatagova was a 1999 Awardee of the Grant for Projects in the Humanities by the American Council of Learned Societies, "doing exemplary work in the humanities during a time of crisis and contraction."

Bibliography
 Contributor: Ethnic and National Issues in Russian and East European History. Edited by John Morison, 2000, 
 Contributor: Religion and identity in modern Russia: the revival of orthodoxy and Islam. By Benjamin Forest, Juliet Johnson. Ashgate Publishing, 2005,  
 Liudmila Gatagova,  "Iudofobiia: summa zol," 4 September 2009 
 Contributor: Russian Studies in History, 43/2, 2004

Notes and references

Full Members of the Russian Academy of Sciences
Living people
21st-century Russian historians
Russian women writers
Women historians
Year of birth missing (living people)
Lezgins